Haji Mohamed Bullaleh commonly known as Haji Warabe was an early 20th century Akil (chief) of the Habr Yunis Rer Ainanshe.

Korahe raid (Hagoogane)

In the early 20th century during the Dervish wars, the British and Abyssinians came to an agreement that cross border camel raiding between the Somali tribes was to be banned and that the offending tribes would be punished by their respective governments. The Abyssinians only nominally having control over the Haud failed to meet their end of the agreement and this resulted in the Dervish and Ogaden alliance raiding with impunity while the Isaaq and Dhulbahante were unable to avenge the raids due to the British Camel corps restraining them and returning looted Ogaden livestock. The secretary administrator of British Somaliland, Douglas James Jardine noted that the Isaaq sub clans inhabiting the Haud were in fact militarily superior and stronger than their Ogaden counterparts. After a series of Dervish-Ogaden raids, tribal elders held talks with the British Government, forcing the latter to lift the ban and let the clans deal with the Dervish-Ogaden themselves. 

On May 18, the Ogadeeen allies (Makaahil, Aladdin and Ba Geri/others) of Khalid sheikh Abdul la's dervish attacked their own Ba-Hawadle-ogaden section who sought safety residing with the Habr Yunis near the Ethiopian/Somali land southern border. The Ogden dervish looted and massacred indiscriminately men , women and children both Ba-Hawadle and Habr Yunis. Archer the governor chose disregard the ban of cross border attacks , since he argued the Ethiopians rarely enforced what the British religiously enforced upon the Isaaq, the one way policy for now was disregarded. Archer only demanded from the various Isaq clans to choose among them a natural leader who could coordinate the counterattack , assemble force and intermediate between the government and the clan forces , they chose a young Akil named Adan Elmi a man with a good reputations among clans and for martial duties The man chosen to lead the tribal forces was Akil Haji Warabe who himself had previous quarrels with the Mullah .The Mad Mullah Of Somali land, Douglas Jardine, pp. 306Personal and Historical Memoirs of an East Africa Administrator pp.112-113 and since 1914 a commander of tribal horses that pursued the new policy of liberating the eastern provinces from the long dervish occupations. Finally, Haji Waraba and Haji Jama Shire led their tribal horses taking the largest dervish chains of forts on February 5 , killing 45 dervishes in the process. Now less than five months later on early July his assembled tribal forces left Buhoodle. Dividing his 3000 men  a unit of 1600 commanded by Farah Isac on July 14 attacked the mullah's forces numbering 1500-foot soldiers and 200 cavalry at Shinila, while the Dolbahanta headed to Ever Ad dry river another 1000 chased the main mullah fleeing forces to Imi, the rout was complete and defestating.

After the bombing campaign of the Taleh fort the Dervish retreated in to the Ogaden territory in Abyssinia and the Mullah was able to attract followers from his tribe. The catalyst for the Hagoogane raid happened on July 14 , 1920 when a Dervish-Ogaden force raided the Ba Hawadle sub clan of the Ogaden who were under the protection of the Isaaq on May 18,, killing women and children in the process. Haji Warabe assembled an army composed of 3000 Habr Yunis, Habr Je'lo  Habr Awal and Dhulbahante warriors. The army set out from Togdheer, on the dawn of July 20, 1920, Haji's army reached Korahe just west of Shineleh where the Dervish and their tribal allies were camped and commenced to attack with them with force. The Dervish-Ogaden numbering 800 were defeated swiftly and only a 100 survived the onslaught and fled south. Haji and his army looted 60,000 livestock and 700 rifles from their defeated foes. During the midst of the battle Haji Warabe entered the Mullah's tent to face his adversary but found the tent empty with the Mullah's tea still hot. The Mullah had fled to Imi where he would die due to influenza shortly afterwards. Haji Warabe's Habr Yunis and Habr Je'lo warriors divided the livestock and rifles amongst themselves denying the Dhulbahante soldiers their share as mentioned by Salaan Carrabey in his Guba poem addressed to Ali Dhuh.

See also
Nur Ahmed Aman
Haji Sudi
Ibrahim Boghol

References

Somali monarchs
20th-century Somalian people
Year of birth missing
Year of death missing